Richard Mathias Bucher (born 1961) is an NBA analyst for Fox Sports and an occasional host of FS1's "Speak" (formerly known as "Speak For Yourself") afternoon talk show. He also hosts a daily podcast, "On The Ball with Ric Bucher." Before joining Fox he was a SiriusXM radio host and senior writer with Bleacher Report. He has appeared on NBA TV as an analyst and on TNT as a sideline reporter for NBA telecasts. Prior to joining SXM, TNT and BR, Bucher worked as an NBA Insider for Comcast SportsNet Bay Area and co-hosted Bucher, Towny and Huff mornings on 95.7 The Game. Bucher's first national platform was as an NBA analyst for ESPN and ESPN.com beginning in 1998. He served as a senior writer for ESPN The Magazine and a columnist for ESPN.com. He joined FOX in 2019.

Born in Cincinnati, Ohio, Bucher is a 1983 graduate of Dartmouth College, where he played four years on the varsity  soccer team. Bucher has covered the NBA since 1992-93, and has been a professional writer for 26 years. He was a beat writer for the San Jose Mercury News and The Washington Post before joining ESPN.

References

External links 
ESPN Search: ric bucher 
Official Bio 

American soccer players
Dartmouth Big Green men's soccer players
Dartmouth College alumni
National Basketball Association broadcasters
Living people
American sports journalists
American sports radio personalities
Radio personalities from San Francisco
The Washington Post journalists
1961 births
The Mercury News people
Association footballers not categorized by position